The Quack or Znachor is a 1937 Polish drama film directed by Michał Waszyński, an adaptation of the novel by Tadeusz Dołęga-Mostowicz published in the same year. It is followed by Profesor Wilczur (1938) and Testament of Profesor Wilczur (1939).

Cast
Kazimierz Junosza-Stępowski ...  Prof. Rafal Wilczur, alias Antoni Kosiba
Elżbieta Barszczewska ...  Beata Wilczurowa, wife / Maria Wilczurówna, daughter
Witold Zacharewicz ...  Leszek Czynski
Józef Węgrzyn...  Dr. Dobraniecki
Mieczysława Ćwiklińska...  Florentyna Szkopkowa
Romuald Gierasieński ...  Franek, the usher (as R. Gierasienski)
Stanisław Grolicki ...  Prokop, father
Wlodzimierz Lozinski ...  Wasyl Prokop
Wojciech Brydzinski ...  Father Czynski
Wanda Jarszewska ...  Mother Czynska
Tadeusz Fijewski ...  Dr. Pawlicki
Marian Wyrzykowski ...  Janek, lover
Jacek Woszczerowicz ...  Jemiol
Zygmunt Biesiadecki ...  The Tramp

External links 
 

1937 films
1930s Polish-language films
Polish black-and-white films
Films directed by Michał Waszyński
Polish drama films
1937 drama films
Films based on Polish novels
Films based on works by Tadeusz Dołęga-Mostowicz